The 22169 / 22170 Santragachi - Rani Kamalapati (Habibganj) Humsafar Express  is a superfast express train of the Indian Railways connecting Santragachi in West Bengal and Habibganj in Madhya Pradesh . It is currently being operated with 22169/22170 train numbers on a weekly basis.

Coach Composition 

Due to non availability of sufficient AC 3-tier passenger from Santragachi station Railway recently introduce sleeper coaches along with AC 3-tier in this train. The train running with new LHB coach with new features like LED screen display to show information about stations, train speed etc. and will have announcement system as well, Vending machines for tea, coffee and milk, Bio toilets in compartments as well as CCTV cameras.

Service

The 22169/Habibganj - Santragachi Humsafar Express has an average speed of 55 km/hr and covers 1435 km in 26h 05m.

The 22170/Santragachi - Habibganj Humsafar Express has an average speed of 58 km/hr and covers 1435 km in 24h 35m.

Route & Halts

Traction

This route is fully electrified and runs from end to end with Itarsi based WAP 7 locomotive.

Rake Sharing
The train shares its rake with 22171/22172 Pune-Habibganj Humsafar Express.

See also 
 Humsafar Express
 Santragachi Junction railway station
 Habibganj railway station

Notes

References 

Humsafar Express trains
Rail transport in Madhya Pradesh
Rail transport in West Bengal
Railway services introduced in 2018